Al Yah Satellite Communications Company P.J.S.C. (Yahsat) is a public company listed on the Abu Dhabi Securities Exchange (ADX) and a subsidiary of Mubadala Investment Company PJSC, offering multi-mission satellite services in more than 150 countries across Europe, the Middle East, Africa, South America, Asia and Australasia. The company offers voice, data, video and internet services for broadcast, Internet and VSAT users for both private and government organisations.

Corporate History
Incorporated in January 2008 the company had an aim of developing, operating and using multi-purpose (Government and commercial) communications satellite systems for the Middle East, Africa, Europe and South-West Asia regions.

In July 2008, Yahsat approved a consortium of EADS Astrium and Thales Alenia to construct Yahsat's own satellites, manufacturing took 36 months to be completed in Europe. Arianespace were appointed to launch the first satellite Al Yah 1, currently positioned at 52.5° East.

In August 2008 Yahsat signed a 15-year lease agreement with the UAE Armed Forces to provide secure satellite communications in the UAE as Yahsat's first government customer. As part of this contract, Yahsat will supply the ground terminals and gateway infrastructure for satellite network services.

In August 2009 Yahsat entered into a partnership with European satellite operator SES to create a new company operating under the brand name YahLive offering Direct-to-Home (DTH) television capacity and services to more than two dozen countries in the Middle East, North Africa and South West Asian region.

The first satellite was launched from the Guiana Space Centre in Kourou, French Guiana on 22 April 2011.

A second satellite (Al Yah 2), weighing approx. 6 tons, has been launched by International Launch Services (ILS) on a Proton Breeze M vehicle from the Baikonour Kosmodrome in Kazakhstan on April 24, 2012, at 22:18 GMT.

Yahsat Satellites

References 

Communications satellite operators
Telecommunications companies of the United Arab Emirates
High throughput satellites